District 28 of the Texas Senate is a senatorial district that currently serves Baylor, Borden, Childress, Coke, Coleman, Concho, Cottle, Crane, Crosby, Dawson, Dickens, Eastland, Fisher, Floyd, Foard, Garza, Hale, Hardeman, Haskell, Hockley, Irion, Jones, Kent, Kimble, King, Knox, Lamb, Lubbock, Lynn, McCulloch, Mason, Menard, Mitchell, Motley, Nolan, Reagan, Runnels, Schleicher, Scurry, Shackelford, Stephens, Sterling, Stonewall, Sutton, Terry, Throckmorton, Tom Green, Upton, Ward, and Wilbarger counties and a portion of Taylor county in the U.S. state of Texas.

The current Senator from District 28 is Charles Perry.

Top 5 biggest cities in district
District 28 has a population of 778,341 with 586,992 that is at voting age from the 2010 census.

Election history
Election history of District 28 from 1992.

Previous elections

2020

2016

2014

2012

2008

2004

2002

1998

1996

1994

1992

District officeholders

Notes

References

.

28
Baylor County, Texas
Borden County, Texas
Childress County, Texas
Coke County, Texas
Coleman County, Texas
Concho County, Texas
Cottle County, Texas
Crane County, Texas
Crosby County, Texas
Dawson County, Texas
Dickens County, Texas
Eastland County, Texas
Fisher County, Texas
Floyd County, Texas
Foard County, Texas
Garza County, Texas
Hale County, Texas
Hardeman County, Texas
Haskell County, Texas
Hockley County, Texas
Irion County, Texas
Jones County, Texas
Kent County, Texas
Kimble County, Texas
King County, Texas
Knox County, Texas
Lamb County, Texas
Lubbock County, Texas
Lynn County, Texas
McCulloch County, Texas
Mason County, Texas
Menard County, Texas
Mitchell County, Texas
Motley County, Texas
Nolan County, Texas
Reagan County, Texas
Runnels County, Texas
Schleicher County, Texas
Scurry County, Texas
Shackelford County, Texas
Stephens County, Texas
Sterling County, Texas
Stonewall County, Texas
Sutton County, Texas
Taylor County, Texas
Terry County, Texas
Throckmorton County, Texas
Tom Green County, Texas
Upton County, Texas
Ward County, Texas
Wilbarger County, Texas